Kristiina Kass (born 14 May 1970) is an Estonian children's writer and illustrator.

Kristiina Kass was born in Tartu. Her father is feuilletonist Kalju Kass and her mother is children's writer Asta Kass.

She studied Finnish language and culture at the University of Helsinki.

She lives in Finland.

Works
She has written 12 children's books and five of which are illustrated by her.

References

1970 births
Living people
Estonian women writers
Estonian children's writers
Estonian women children's writers
20th-century Estonian writers
21st-century Estonian writers
Estonian women illustrators
University of Helsinki alumni
Estonian expatriates in Finland
People from Tartu